Daguan County is located in Zhaotong Prefecture in northeastern Yunnan Province, China.

Administrative divisions
Daguan County has 8 towns and 1 ethnic township. 
8 towns

1 ethnic township
 Shanggaoqiao Hui, Yi and Miao

Transport 
China National Highway 213

Climate

References

External links
Daguan County Official Website

County-level divisions of Zhaotong